Thallyson Augusto Tavares Dias (born 1 December 1991), simply known as Thallyson, is a Brazilian professional footballer who plays as a left back for Portuguesa.

Club career
On 24 July 2020, Thallyson signed a two-year contract with Azerbaijan Premier League side Neftçi PFK. On 30 June 2021, Neftçi announced that Thallyson had left the club after his contract was ended by mutual agreement.

References

External links

1991 births
Living people
Brazilian footballers
Brazilian expatriate footballers
Association football defenders
Agremiação Sportiva Arapiraquense players
CR Flamengo footballers
Fortaleza Esporte Clube players
Associação Ferroviária de Esportes players
Ceará Sporting Club players
Red Bull Brasil players
Esporte Clube Vitória players
Grêmio Novorizontino players
Sint-Truidense V.V. players
Guarani FC players
Neftçi PFK players
Esporte Clube Santo André players
Associação Portuguesa de Desportos players
Campeonato Brasileiro Série A players
Campeonato Brasileiro Série B players
Campeonato Brasileiro Série C players
Campeonato Brasileiro Série D players
Azerbaijan Premier League players
Brazilian expatriate sportspeople in Belgium
Expatriate footballers in Belgium
Expatriate footballers in Azerbaijan
Brazilian expatriate sportspeople in Azerbaijan